Ghazar Parpetsi was a 5th to 6th century Armenian chronicler and historian. He had close ties with the powerful Mamikonian noble family and is most prominent for writing a history of Armenia, History of Armenia, sometime in the early sixth century.

Life
Ghazar was born in the village of Parpi (near the town of Ashtarak in Armenia, then under Sasanian rule), and was raised by a princess of the Mamikonian family. Owing to the close ties he held with the Mamikonian family, following the defeat of the Armenians at the battle of Avarayr in 451, Ghazar moved to the Mamikonian Prince Ashusah's castle in Gugark, where he received his primary education. Studying under the auspices of Aghan Artstruni, he befriended Vahan Mamikonian; he was an excellent student and from 465 to 470 he attended school in Constantinople, learning new languages, studying religion, literature, and classical philosophy. Returning to Armenia, Ghazar busied himself with educational and spiritual activities in the town of Shirak, then part of the domains of the Kamsarakan family. From 484 to 486, he lived in Syunik until Vahan Mamikonian, who had been recently appointed the head of marzpan Armenia, invited him to oversee the reconstruction of a monastery being built in Vagharshapat. Vahan appointed Ghazar an abbot at the monastery, although the education that Ghazar had received as well as his educational and spiritual policies did not suit well with the more conservative elements of the church. Accusing him of heresy, he was forced out of the monastery in 490, taking up residence in the city of Amida in Byzantium.

According to Armenian tradition, it is said that Ghazar was buried near the ruins of an Armenian church in Parpi Canyon, south of a village named Lazrev in Armenia.

Works
Ghazar is best known for writing the History of Armenia. After returning from Amida in 493, Vahan Mamikonian asked his friend to write a new history of Armenia, starting from where historian Faustus of Byzantium left off; that is, with the reign of king Arsaces II (Arshak II). History is composed of three parts: the first is about Armenian history from the mid-fourth century and life in Armenia under Sasanian rule until the deaths of Sahak Partev and Mesrop Mashtots in the mid-fifth century; the second concerns the events leading up to the battle of Avarayr as well as its subsequent consequences; and the third follows up on the Vartanank wars and the 484 signing of the Nvarsak Treaty. The main sources he uses in History are the primary works of other historians, Agathangelos, Koryun, and Faustus, although he apparently made use of other historians' works, including Eusebius of Caesarea's Historia Ecclesiastica.

Translations

English translations 

The History of Armenia, translated into English by Robert Bedrosian (1980).

The History of Armenia, translated into English by Robert W. Thomson (1991).

References

Sources

External links
Translator's Preface to the English translation of History of the Armenians
English translation of the History of the Armenians – mirror if main site unavailable

5th-century Armenian historians
6th-century Armenian historians
Armenian people from the Sasanian Empire